Slim and I is a 2020 Australian documentary film directed by Kriv Stenders about the life of Joy McKean and Slim Dusty, Australia's most successful husband and wife singer-songwriter duo.

Making of the documentary 

The documentary came about through the passion of Slim and Joy's grandson James Arneman, who had compiled an archive of old footage of the families touring days. The family was approached by film producer Chris Brown before director Kriv Stenders joined the project. Stenders said "The idea to tell their story through the lens of Joy was something that I found very interesting about this project and made me want to be involved the documentary. I knew very little about Slim and Joy, but I listened to their music and read the books about their lives and discovered such an incredible story that needed to be told."

Cinematic launch

Slim and I was released in Australian cinemas in September 2020, during the COVID-19 pandemic, which delayed the film's release in the State of Victoria. The world première took place in Kempsey, New South Wales, close to where Slim Dusty grew up. The Governor of New South Wales Margaret Beazley attended the red carpet event, along with the Member for Oxley Melinda Pavey and Kempsey Shire Mayor Liz Campbell. Joy McKean also attended along with children Anne and David Kirkpatrick, director Kriv Stenders and producer Aline Jacques. The film reached Australian cinemas on 10 September 2020.

Critical reception

Following its Australian premiere, the film received rave reviews. The Sydney Morning Herald'''s Paul Byrnes gave it four stars and called it "pure joy, in more ways than one". The Australian newspaper review by Stephen Romei called it a "brilliant love story" and an "utterly charming film", and also gave four stars. Anthony Morris for Screenhub gave it four stars and wrote: "This fast moving, insightful and always entertaining film is firmly a tribute to Joy, and rightly so: if Slim Dusty was 'the man who is Australia', she was the woman who made the man." Out in Perth'' gave it four and a half stars and wrote "After viewing this very Australian story, you are left questioning why this wasn’t made years ago."

Awards and nominations

Soundtrack

A soundtrack was released on 4 September 2020.

Track listing

Charts

Weekly charts

Year-end charts

Release history

See also
 Cinema of Australia
 Australian country music

References

External links
 
 
 

Country music films
Musical films based on actual events
2020 films
Slim Dusty albums
Australian biographical films
Films about entertainers
Jukebox musical films
2020 soundtrack albums
Soundtracks by Australian artists
Compilation albums by Australian artists
EMI Records albums
Films directed by Kriv Stenders
2020s English-language films
Screen Australia films